The Tahakopa River flows southeastward through the Catlins, an area of the southern South Island of New Zealand. The Maclennan River is a tributary.

External links
Tahakopa River biodiversity project

Rivers of Otago
The Catlins
Rivers of New Zealand
Clutha District